"History's Stranglers" is a song by the Los Angeles-based punk rock band The Bronx, released as the first single from their 2006 album The Bronx.

While the album was released by the Island Def Jam Music Group and the band's own label White Drugs, the singles for all of their albums have been released exclusively in the United Kingdom, through Wichita Recordings. The single was released on both compact disc and 7-inch vinyl, the latter pressed on transparent vinyl and limited to 1,500 copies. The B-side song, "Venice", is an outtake from the album's recording sessions. The cover artwork was designed by guitarist Joby J. Ford.

The music video for "History's Stranglers" was directed by Mike Piscitelli. It depicts camcorder footage of a child's outdoor birthday party, with the band members' heads composited over some of the children's. The children engage in various activities such as playing on a playground and in an inflatable structure, receiving balloon models from a clown, and breaking a piñata. At the end of the video the birthday boy, with the head of singer Matt Caughthran, throws a tantrum and smashes his own birthday cake.

Track listing

CD version

Vinyl version

Personnel

Band
 Matt Caughthran – lead vocals
 Joby J. Ford – guitar, backing vocals, artwork and design
 James Tweedy – bass guitar, backing vocals
 Jorma Vik – drums

Production
 Michael Beinhorn – producer, recording
 Ross Hogarth – recording
 Nick Paige – recording assistant
 Mike Shipley – mixing engineer
 Brian Wolgemuth – mixing assistant
 Karl Egsieker – engineer

See also
The Bronx discography

References

The Bronx (band) songs
2006 singles
Song recordings produced by Michael Beinhorn
2006 songs